Hampton High School may refer to:

In Australia
Hampton High School, Melbourne, Hampton, Victoria
Hampton Senior High School, Morley, Western Australia

In the United States
East Hampton High School, East Hampton, New York
East Hampton High School, East Hampton, Connecticut
Easthampton High School, Easthampton, Massachusetts
Hampton High School (Arkansas) of Hampton, Arkansas
Hampton High School (Allison Park, Pennsylvania) of Allison Park, Pennsylvania
Hampton High School (Florida) of Ocala, Florida
Hampton High School (Georgia) of Hampton, Georgia
Hampton High School (Hampton, Tennessee) of Hampton, Tennessee
Hampton High School (Virginia) of Hampton, Virginia
New Hampton High School, New Hampton, Iowa
Wade Hampton High School (Greenville, South Carolina) of Greenville, South Carolina
Wade Hampton High School (Varnville, South Carolina) of Varnville, South Carolina

Elsewhere
Hampton High, London, London, UK
Hampton High School (New Brunswick) of Hampton, New Brunswick, Canada
Hampton High School, Jamaica of Malvern, Jamaica